Geoff, Geoffrey, Jeffrey, Jefferson or Jeff Morris may refer to:

Entertainment industry figures
Jeff Morris (actor) (1934–2004), American film and television performer
Jefferson Morris, American singer; winner of 1958 Metropolitan Opera National Council Auditions#1950s
Jeffrey Morris, American filmmaker; wrote and directed 2015's Oceanus: Act One

Footballers
Geoff Morris (footballer, born 1949) (1949–2015), English left winger during 1960s and 1970s
Geoff Morris (Australian footballer) (born 1954), coach for West Adelaide during 1990s
Geoff Morris (rugby league), English left winger during 1970s and 1980s

Others
Jeff Morris (politician) (born 1964), American member of Washington House of Representatives